This is a list of official and notable unofficial terms used to designate the citizens of specific states, federal district, and territories of the United States of America.

List

Maps

See also

Demonym
List of adjectival and demonymic forms of place names
List of adjectivals and demonyms for astronomical bodies
List of adjectivals and demonyms for continental regions
List of adjectivals and demonyms for subcontinental regions
List of adjectival and demonymic forms for countries and nations
List of adjectivals and demonyms for Australia
List of adjectivals and demonyms for Canada
List of adjectivals and demonyms for Cuba
List of adjectivals and demonyms for India
List of adjectivals and demonyms for Malaysia
List of adjectivals and demonyms for Mexico
List of adjectivals and demonyms for New Zealand
List of adjectivals and demonyms for the Philippines
List of adjectivals and demonyms for cities
List of adjectivals and demonyms for former regions
List of adjectivals and demonyms for Greco-Roman antiquity
List of adjectivals and demonyms for fictional regions

References

External links

Demonyms
American regional nicknames
United States